Nanci is a feminine given name. Notable people with the name include:

Nanci Bowen (born 1967), American golfer
Nanci Chambers, Canadian American actress who was born in Ontario, Canada
Nanci Griffith, (1953–2021), American singer, guitarist and songwriter from Austin, Texas
Nanci Kincaid, American novelist
Nanci Parilli (born 1953), Argentine Justicialist Party politician

See also

 
Nancy (disambiguation)
Nancey (disambiguation)
Nance (disambiguation)

Feminine given names